Lubomír Pokluda (born 17 March 1958 in Vojkovice) is a Czech former footballer.

References

 
 League statistics
 
 

1958 births
Living people
Czech footballers
Czechoslovak footballers
Czechoslovakia international footballers
Footballers at the 1980 Summer Olympics
Olympic footballers of Czechoslovakia
Olympic gold medalists for Czechoslovakia
AC Sparta Prague players
FK Teplice players
FK Hvězda Cheb players
FK Inter Bratislava players
Lierse S.K. players
Olympic medalists in football
Czechoslovak expatriate footballers
Expatriate footballers in Belgium
Czechoslovak expatriate sportspeople in Belgium
Medalists at the 1980 Summer Olympics
Association football midfielders
People from Frýdek-Místek District
Sportspeople from the Moravian-Silesian Region